Zhilin may refer to:
 
Zhilin (given name)
Zhilin (surname)